Shri Krishna Janma (Birth of Lord Krishna) is a 1918 Indian silent film directed by Dadasaheb Phalke. It contain Marathi subtitles. Only the last episode is still available (576 ft).

References

External links 

 
 Full movie on YouTube, also 

1918 films
Indian black-and-white films
Indian silent films
Articles containing video clips
1910s Marathi-language films
Films directed by Dadasaheb Phalke